Mount Josephine is a peak in the Sawtooth Mountains of northeastern Minnesota, in the United States. It overlooks Grand Portage Bay of Lake Superior.

History
The mountain was named in honor of a young woman, Josephine Godfrey of Detroit, Michigan, who led a party of young friends on a daylong excursion from Grand Portage, Minnesota to the summit in 1853. Miss Godfrey's father, John Godfrey, owned a trading post at the present site of Grand Marais, Minnesota until 1858.

References

Mountains of Cook County, Minnesota
Josephine